This list of fossil arthropods described in 2012 is a list of new taxa of trilobites, fossil insects, crustaceans, arachnids and other fossil arthropods of every kind that have been described during the year 2012. The list only includes taxa at the level of genus or species.

Arachnids

Crustaceans

Insects

Blattodea

Coleoptera

Diptera

Ephemeroptera

Hemiptera

Hymenoptera

Mecoptera

Neuroptera

Notoptera

Odonatoptera

Orthopterida

Raphidioptera

Other

General research
The oldest member of the tiger moth subfamily Arctiinae is noted, but not described from the Klondike Mountain Formation.

Eurypterids

Trilobites

Others

References

Arthropod paleontology
Lists of arthropods
2010s in paleontology
Paleontology
Articles containing video clips
2012 in paleontology